Dinocephalus ocellatus is a species of beetle in the family Cerambycidae. It was described by Per Olof Christopher Aurivillius in 1908. It is known from Tanzania.

References

Endemic fauna of Tanzania
Tragocephalini
Beetles described in 1908